Edward Shillington may refer to:

 Ned Shillington (Edward Blaine Shillington, born 1944), Canadian politician in  Saskatchewan 
 Edward Shillington (New Zealand) (1835–1920), New Zealand librarian